The Nasdaq-100 (^NDX) is a stock market index made up of 101 equity securities issued by 100 of the largest non-financial companies listed on the Nasdaq stock exchange. It is a modified capitalization-weighted index. The stocks' weights in the index are based on their market capitalizations, with certain rules capping the influence of the largest components. It is limited to companies from a single exchange, and it does not have any financial companies. The financial companies are in a separate index, the NASDAQ Financial-100.

History
The NASDAQ-100 was launched on January 31, 1985 by the Nasdaq. It created two indices: the NASDAQ-100, which consists of Industrial, Technology, Retail, Telecommunication, Biotechnology, Health Care, Transportation, Media and Service companies, and the NASDAQ Financial-100, which consists of banking companies, insurance firms, brokerage firms, and Mortgage loan companies.

The base price of the index was initially set at 250, but when it closed near 800 on December 31, 1993, the base was reset at 125 the following trading day, leaving the halved NASDAQ-100 price below that of the more commonly known NASDAQ Composite. The first annual adjustments were made in 1993 in advance of options on the index that would trade at the Chicago Board Options Exchange in 1994. Foreign companies were first admitted to the NASDAQ-100 in January 1998, but had higher standards to meet before they could be added. Those standards were relaxed in 2002, while standards for domestic firms were raised, ensuring that all companies met the same standards.

Investing in the NASDAQ-100
The Invesco QQQ exchange-traded fund, sponsored and overseen since March 21, 2007 by Invesco, trades under the ticker . It is nicknamed “triple Qs” or “cubes”. It was formerly called NASDAQ-100 Trust Series 1. On December 1, 2004, it was moved from the American Stock Exchange, where it had the symbol QQQ, to the NASDAQ, and given the new ticker symbol QQQQ, sometimes called the "quad Qs" by traders. On March 23, 2011, Nasdaq changed its symbol back to QQQ.

QQQ is one of the most actively traded exchange-traded funds in the United States.

The NASDAQ-100 is often abbreviated as NDX100 in the derivatives markets. Its corresponding futures contracts are traded on the Chicago Mercantile Exchange. The regular futures are denoted by the Reuters Instrument Code ND, and the smaller E-mini version uses the code NQ. Both are among the most heavily traded futures at the exchange.

Performance

Price history & milestones
The index set highs above the 4,700 level at the peak of the dot-com bubble in 2000, but fell 78% during the Stock market downturn of 2002.

After a gradual 5-year recovery to an intraday high of 2,239.51 on October 31, 2007, the highest reached since February 16, 2002, the index corrected below the 2,000 level in early 2008 amid the Late-2000s recession, the United States housing bubble and the Financial crisis of 2007–2008. Panic focusing on the failure of the investment banking industry culminated in a loss of more than 10% on September 29, 2008, subsequently plunging the index firmly into a bear market. The NASDAQ-100, with much of the broader market, experienced a Limit down open on October 24 and reached a 6-year intraday low of 1,018 on November 20, 2008.

Amid quantitative easing (QE) from the Federal Reserve and optimism that the financial crisis was ending, the index embarked on a volatile four-year climb higher, closing above 3,000 on May 15, 2013 for the first time since November 15, 2000. By October 18, 2013, with GOOG passing $1,000 per share for the first time, the index had made a closing high of 3,353.88 and intraday high of 3,355.63, its highest levels since the 2000 United States elections and more than triple the 2008 low.

Record values

List of 1000-point milestones by number of trading days

Annual Returns
The following table shows the annual development of the NASDAQ-100 since 1985.

Selection criteria 
The NASDAQ has refined a series of stringent standards which companies must meet to be indexed. Those standards include:
 Being listed exclusively on NASDAQ in either the Global Select or Global Market tiers.
 Being publicly offered on an established American market for at least three months.
 Having average daily volume of 200,000 shares.
 Being current in regards to quarterly and annual reports.
 Not being in bankruptcy proceedings.

Additionally, since 2014, companies with multiple classes of stock are allowed to have multiple classes included in the index, provided they meet NASDAQ's criteria. Prior to 2014, companies were limited to one class of stock in the index (usually the one with the larger market capitalization).

Yearly rebalancing and re-ranking
While the composition of the NASDAQ-100 changes in the case of delisting (such as transferring to another exchange, mergers and acquisitions, or declaring bankruptcy, and in a few cases, being delisted by NASDAQ for failing to meet listing requirements), the index is rebalanced once a year, in December, when NASDAQ reviews its components, compares them with those not in the index, re-ranks all eligible companies and makes the appropriate adjustments.

There are two tools the NASDAQ uses to determine the market values of companies for the annual review:
 Share Prices as of the last trading day in October.
 Publicly announced share totals as of the last trading day of November.

Those components that are in the top 100 of all eligible companies at the annual review are retained in the index. Those ranked 101 to 125 are retained only if they were in the top 100 of the previous year's annual review. If they fail to move into the top 100 in the following year's review, they are dropped. Those not ranked in the top 125 are dropped regardless of the previous year's rank.

The index also drops a company if, at the end of two consecutive months, it fails to have an index weighting of at least one-tenth of a percent. This can occur at any time. Companies that are dropped are replaced by those with the largest market value that are not already in the index. Anticipation of these changes can lead to changes in the stock prices of affected companies.

The index publicly announces all changes, regardless of when they occur, via press releases at least five business days before the change takes place. The 2018 results of the re-ranking and rebalancing were announced on December 14, with the changes effective the morning of December 24, coinciding with the expiration of options on December 21.

Differences from NASDAQ Composite index
The NASDAQ-100 is frequently confused with the Nasdaq Composite Index. The latter index (often referred to simply as "The Nasdaq") includes the stock of every company that is listed on NASDAQ (more than 3,000 altogether) and is quoted more frequently than the NASDAQ-100 in popular media.

The NASDAQ-100 is a modified capitalization-weighted index. This particular methodology was created in 1998 in advance of the creation of the NASDAQ-100 Index Trust, which holds portions of all NASDAQ-100 firms. The new methodology allowed NASDAQ to reduce the influence of the largest companies and to allow for more diversification. However, the weights of the stocks were not changed after that, which led to more problems. In May 2011, NASDAQ did a major rebalance of the index to bring it closer to market-cap weighting.

The index is rebalanced quarterly only if:
 One company is worth 24% of the index
 Companies with a weighting of at least 4.5% make up 48% or more of the index

The index is rebalanced annually, after the quarterly rebalancing, only if:
 One company is worth 15% of the index
 The five largest companies by market capitalizations have weights of 40% or more of the index

Differences from other indices
In addition to its almost complete lack of financial companies, the Nasdaq-100 includes five companies incorporated outside the United States. Although the S&P 500 Index includes non-U.S. companies, the Dow Jones Industrial Average has never included foreign companies.

As of December 2022, the index's five companies incorporated in foreign countries are as follows:
 Cayman Islands (all headquartered in China) - JD.com, PDD Holdings
 England and Wales - AstraZeneca
 The Netherlands - ASML Holding, NXP

Additionally, the NASDAQ-100 is also the only index of the three that has a regularly scheduled re-ranking of its index each year (in December), ensuring that the largest non-financial companies on NASDAQ are accurately included.

Related indices
In 2006, NASDAQ created a "farm team" index, the NASDAQ Q-50, representing the next fifty stocks in line to enter the NASDAQ-100. With some exceptions, most stocks that are added to the index come up through the Q-50. In 2011, NASDAQ created the NASDAQ-500 to track the 500 largest stocks on NASDAQ, and the NASDAQ-400, tracking those stocks not included in the NASDAQ-100.

NASDAQ has also divided the 100 into two distinct sub-indices; the NASDAQ-100 Tech follows those components who service the tech sector, and the NASDAQ-100 Ex-Tech, which follows those components that are not considered tech companies. The latter index includes noted e-commerce companies Amazon.com and eBay, which are classified as retailers.

Components
This table is current as of the open of trading on December 19, 2022. An up-to-date list is available in the External links section.

Historical components
As of November 2022, 500 companies have been components of the index. Of these, only four, Apple, Costco (through its merger in 1993 with Price Club, with Costco, as a separate entity, not becoming a component until at least 1989), Intel and PACCAR, have been components, continuously, since the first dissemination of the index in 1985. Two other current components, KLA Corporation and Micron Technology, were also components when the index started, but have been removed from the index over time for various reasons.

Yearly changes

Changes from 2008–2011
DirecTV replaced BEA Systems on April 30, CA, Inc. replaced Tellabs on May 19. FLIR Systems replaced UAL Corporation on July 21, and on November 10 Seagate Technology replaced Monster Worldwide. On December 22, 2008, NASDAQ added the following companies to the NASDAQ-100 index: Automatic Data Processing, First Solar, Life Technologies, Ross Stores, Maxim Integrated Products, Illumina, Inc., Pharmaceutical Product Development, O'Reilly Auto Parts, Urban Outfitters, J. B. Hunt, and Warner Chilcott, replacing Amylin Pharmaceuticals, Cadence Design Systems, Discovery Communications, Lamar Advertising Company, Leap Wireless International, Level 3 Communications, PetSmart, SanDisk, Sirius XM Radio, Virgin Media, and Whole Foods Market.

On January 20, 2009, News Corporation was added to the index, replacing Focus Media Holding, which did not meet the minimum monthly weight requirements. On July 17, 2009, Cerner replaced Sun Microsystems after Sun Microsystems was acquired by Oracle Corporation. On October 29, 2009, Priceline.com replaced Juniper Networks after Juniper transferred its listing to the NYSE. On December 21, 2009, seven stocks joined the NASDAQ-100 index before the market open: Vodafone, Mattel, BMC Software, Mylan, Qiagen, SanDisk and Virgin Media. These stocks replaced Akamai Technologies, Hansen Natural, IAC/InterActiveCorp, Liberty Global, Pharmaceutical Product Development, Ryanair and Steel Dynamics.

On December 20, 2010, seven companies were added to the NASDAQ-100 index: F5 Networks, Akamai Technologies, Netflix, Micron Technology, Whole Foods Market, Ctrip and Dollar Tree, replacing Cintas, Dish Network, Foster Wheeler, Hologic, J. B. Hunt, Logitech and Patterson Companies. These were the only changes made to the index that year and the fewest since 1997.

On April 4, 2011, Alexion Pharmaceuticals replaced Genzyme before the market open. On May 27, 2011, Green Mountain Coffee Roasters replaced Millicom International Cellular after Millicom (MICC) withdrew its NASDAQ listing. On July 15, 2011, Sirius XM Radio replaced Cephalon in the index, and on December 6, 2011, Perrigo joined the index, replacing Joy Global, which transferred its listing to the NYSE. Perrigo had been a member of the index in the 1990s, being dropped in 1996. On December 19, 2011, five companies joined the NASDAQ-100 index due to the annual reranking of the index: Avago Technologies, Fossil, Inc., Monster Beverage (Hansen Natural Corporation), Nuance Communications, and Randgold Resources, replacing FLIR Systems, Illumina, NII Holdings, Qiagen, and Urban Outfitters.

Changes in 2012
On April 23, 2012, Texas Instruments replaced First Solar . On May 30, 2012, Viacom became a component of the index, replacing Teva Pharmaceutical Industries, which transferred to the NYSE. On July 23, 2012, Kraft Foods, now known as Mondelez, became a component of the index, replacing Ctrip. Kraft Foods was the fourth component of the NASDAQ-100 to also be included in the Dow Jones Industrial Average, joining Cisco Systems, Intel, and Microsoft, but was removed from the DJIA when it subsequently split into two companies. On Wednesday December 12, 2012, Facebook, Inc. was added to the index, replacing Infosys, which transferred its listing to the NYSE. On December 24, 2012, 20 changes to the index took place. The ten companies joining the index were Analog Devices, Catamaran Corporation, Discovery Communications, Equinix, Liberty Global, Liberty Media, Regeneron Pharmaceuticals, SBA Communications, Verisk Analytics and Western Digital. The ten companies being dropped were Apollo Group, Electronic Arts, Flextronics, Green Mountain Coffee Roasters, Lam Research, Marvell Technology Group, Netflix, Research in Motion, VeriSign and Warner Chilcott.

Changes in 2013
On January 15, 2013, Starz Inc. replaced Liberty Media after a spinoff. On March 18, 2013, Kraft Foods Group Inc. replaced Starz Inc. On June 5, 2013, Liberty Media replaced Virgin Media after the companies merged. On June 6, 2013, Netflix replaced Perrigo, which had transferred to the NYSE. On July 15, 2013, Tesla Motors replaced Oracle Corporation, which transferred to the NYSE. On July 25, Charter Communications replaced BMC Software. On August 22, Green Mountain Coffee Roasters returned to the index, replacing Life Technologies. On October 29, VimpelCom Ltd. replaced DELL. On November 18, Marriott International was added to the index, replacing Randgold Resources. On December 23, 2013, 10 changes to the index took place. The five companies joining the index were DISH Network Corporation, Illumina, NXP Semiconductors, Tractor Supply Company, and TripAdvisor. The five companies that were dropped were Fossil, Inc., Microchip Technology, Nuance Communications, Sears Holdings Corporation, and Dentsply.

Changes in 2014
On April 3, 2014, the Class C common stock of Google was added to the index as a result of Google's stock split.  This meant the index had 101 components. Later in 2014, additional classes of stock from other index companies were added to the index, bringing the number of constituent securities in the index to 107. On December 12, 2014, NASDAQ announced that American Airlines Group, Electronic Arts, and Lam Research would be added to the index, effective December 22, replacing Expedia, Inc., F5 Networks, and Maxim Integrated Products.

Changes in 2015
On March 23, Walgreens Boots Alliance replaced Equinix in the index. Equinix converted into a real estate investment trust, making it ineligible for inclusion in the NASDAQ-100, but it did gain eligibility for the NASDAQ Financial-100. On July 1, Liberty Interactive created two new tracking stocks, tracking the company's interests in Latin America. Both tracking stocks were added to the index the same day. On July 2, Kraft Foods merged with Heinz, becoming the Kraft Heinz Company. Catamaran Corporation was removed from the index after the close of trading on July 23, after going private. JD.com replaced it on July 29. DirecTV was removed from the index on July 24 and replaced by BioMarin Pharmaceutical on July 27. Sigma-Aldrich was removed on July 31, after being acquired by Merck KGaA. Skyworks Solutions replaced Sigma-Aldrich on August 3.

Altera was removed on October 7 as a result of its merger with Intel. Incyte replaced Altera's on that date. PayPal was added to the index on November 11, as Broadcom was in the process of merging with Avago.

NASDAQ announced on December 11 that seven companies would be replaced in the index on December 21 due to annual re-ranking: Ctrip, Endo International, Expedia, Inc., Maxim Integrated Products, Norwegian Cruise Line, T-Mobile US, and Ulta Beauty, replacing C. H. Robinson Worldwide, Expeditors International, Garmin, Keurig Green Mountain, Staples, Inc., VimpelCom, and Wynn ResortsTwo Liberty Media (Liberty Global plc) tracking stocks (LILA) and (LILAK) were removed from the index, leaving 106 separate components.

Changes in 2016
On February 1, Avago Technologies changed its name to Broadcom Limited. On February 22, CSX Corporation replaced KLA-Tencor as a member of the index. On March 16, NetEase replaced SanDisk as a member of the index. On April 18, Liberty Media established two tracking stocks (BATRA), (BATRK) to follow the performance of its investment in the Atlanta Braves. On June 20, Dentsply Sirona returned to the index, replacing four Liberty Media tracking stocks (LMCA), (LMCK), (BATRA), (BATRK). On July 18, Microchip Technology Incorporated returned to the index, replacing Endo International plc. On October 19, Shire PLC replaced Linear Technology in the index. On December 9, the annual re-ranking of the index was announced, resulting in four changes. Joining the index December 19 were Cintas, Hasbro, Hologic and KLA-Tencor. Bed Bath & Beyond, NetApp, Stericycle and Whole Foods Market were dropped from the index.

Changes in 2017
On February 1, Tesla Motors changed its corporate name to simply Tesla. On February 7, J. B. Hunt replaced NXP Semiconductors in the index. On March 20, Idexx Laboratories replaced SBA Communications in the index after SBA converted to a REIT, rendering it ineligible for inclusion. On April 24, Wynn Resorts replaced TripAdvisor. On June 19, MercadoLibre replaced Yahoo! Inc due to its acquisition by Verizon and subsequent conversion to a closed-end fund. On October 23, Align Technology replaced Mattel in the index. On December 8, NASDAQ announced that five companies would enter the index on December 18. They were ASML Holding, Cadence Design Systems, Synopsys, Take-Two Interactive, and Workday, Inc. These companies replaced Akamai Technologies, Discovery Communications - both classes listed in the index (DISCA) (DISCK), Norwegian Cruise Lines, Tractor Supply and Viacom.

Changes in 2018
On July 23, PepsiCo replaced Dish Network. On November 5, NXP Semiconductors replaced CA, which merged with Broadcom. On November 19, Xcel Energy replaced Dentsply Sirona. On December 14, NASDAQ announced that 6 stocks will join the index on December 24: Advanced Micro Devices, lululemon Athletica, NetApp, United Continental Holdings, Verisign, and Willis Towers Watson, replacing Express Scripts, Hologic, Qurate Retail Group, Seagate Technology, Shire and Vodafone.

Changes in 2019
On March 19, the two classes of stock of Fox Corporation replaced the two classes of stock of 21st Century Fox. On November 21, Exelon Corporation replaced Celgene. On December 13, Nasdaq announced that as a result of the annual re-ranking of the index, six companies would join December 23: Ansys, CDW, Copart, CoStar Group, Seattle Genetics, and Splunk, replacing Hasbro, Henry Schein, J.B. Hunt, Mylan, NortonLifeLock, and Wynn Resorts.

Changes in 2020
On April 20, Dexcom replaced American Airlines Group in the index, and Zoom Video Communications replaced Willis Towers Watson on April 30. On June 22, DocuSign replaced United Airlines Holdings, and other replacements that year included Moderna replacing CoStar Group on July 20, Pinduoduo replacing NetApp on August 24, and Keurig Dr Pepper replacing Western Digital on October 19. On December 21, six companies joined the index: American Electric Power, Atlassian, Marvell Technology Group, Match Group, Okta, and Peloton Interactive. They replaced BioMarin Pharmaceutical, Citrix Systems, Expedia Group, Liberty Global (both classes of shares), Take-Two Interactive, and Ulta Beauty.

Changes in 2021
On July 21, Honeywell replaced Alexion Pharmaceuticals, following its acquisition by AstraZeneca.
On August 26, Crowdstrike replaced Maxim Integrated Products, which was acquired by Analog Devices.

On December 10, 2021 Nasdaq announced that six new companies would join the index prior to the market open on December 20, 2021. They are Airbnb (ABNB), Datadog (DDOG), Fortinet (FTNT), Lucid Group (LCID), Palo Alto Networks (PANW), and Zscaler (ZS). They will replace CDW (CDW), Cerner (CERN), Check Point (CHKP), Fox Corporation (FOXA/FOX), Incyte (INCY), and Trip.com (TCOM).

Changes in 2022 
On January 24, Old Dominion Freight Line replaced Peloton.

On February 2, Constellation Energy was announced as being added to the index as of the end of the previous day. Exelon, from which Constellation was spun off, remained in the index; this increased the number of companies in the index to 101 and the number of stocks to 102 (because 2 classes of Alphabet Inc. stock are in the index).

On February 22, AstraZeneca replaced Xilinx, which was being acquired by AMD.

On November 21, Enphase Energy replaced Okta.

On December 19, the annual re-ranking of the index took place prior to market open. The six stocks joining the index were CoStar Group, Rivian Automotive, Warner Bros. Discovery, GlobalFoundries, Baker Hughes, and Diamondback Energy. They replaced Baidu, DocuSign, Match Group, NetEase, Skyworks Solutions, Splunk, and Verisign. Dropping seven components allowed the Nasdaq-100 index to once again have 100 companies.

References

External links
 
 Components
 NASDAQ Stock Market Indices

American stock market indices
Nasdaq